Peru's Next Top Model is a Peruvian reality television series, based on Tyra Banks' America's Next Top Model. It is the fourth franchise in Latin America after Brazil's Next Top Model, Mexico's Next Top Model, and Colombia's Next Top Model.  The first season of the series began to air on ATV on September 7, 2013.

Peru's Next Top Model, Season 1, was the first  and only installment, hosted by Peruvian model Valeria De Santis. The series featured fifteen finalists in its cast. Production lasted a total of three months, and the footage was divided into twelve episodes.

The winner of the competition was 23-year-old Danea Panta from Trujillo. As her prizes, she received a contract with Mega Model Management in Miami, the front cover of Cosas magazine, a $10,000 dollar contract with L'Bel Cosmetics, a $10,000 dollar contract with Moda Falabella, and a $5,000 dollar contract with Pantene Pro-v.

Cycles

Episode summaries

Episode 1
First aired: September 7, 2013

First eliminated: Vanesa Mathey & Nataly Zúñiga	
Bottom two: Mishell Aguilar & Samantha Batallanos
Second eliminated: Samantha Batallanos
 Featured photographer: Lucia Arana
 Production Company : Canica Films www.canicafilms.com
General Manager Producer: Maria Teresa Benvenuto

Episode 2
First aired: September 14, 2013

For the week's challenge, the girls had to create outfits using garments from "Basement". Johana, Danea and Laura excelled, while Lorena, Giordana and Mishell struggled. Giordana's outfit was deemed the worst because the clothes did not match, the outfit was not styled properly and she didn't pull off the oversized pants, while Johana won the challenge, which earned her a S/.3,000 worth shopping spree from Basement, courtesy of Saga Falabella.

Drama occurred in the house between Danea, Molly and Johana when Danea accused Johana of talking about her behind her back and the other girls, particularly Molly, join in the accusation. Molly and Johana fight, leaving Danea guilty for starting it.

For the photo shoot, the girls posed on a platform at Gamarra, rocking over-the-top styling. Most girls were confident in the shoot, while some girls such as Mishell and Danea were tense and worried. Some girls such as Sharinna and Sami struggled with their outfits but still produced good pictures.

At panel, Giordana's photo was praised by the judges. Sharinna was told her picture was bold but not good, but she was congratulated by the judges for correcting herself and for her original hairstyle at panel. Laura was told she was the best and was praised for her originality and pulling off unconventional poses. Mishell was criticized for lack of attitude in panel and not having diversity of poses. Gianna is told she is one of the few with attitude in her face, while the other contenders had the attitude in their body. Sami was praised for not looking at the camera but the judges did not like how her face was hidden in her photo.

Laura won best photo, earning her a laser treatment, while Mishell and Lorena landed in the bottom two for not owning their beauty and making it high fashion. Ultimately, Mishell was eliminated for not having any attitude in panel.

Best photo: Laura Cuadros		
Bottom two: Lorena Dávila & Mishell Aguilar	
Eliminated: Mishell Aguilar	
Featured photographer: Gustavo Arrué
Special guests: Rafo Delgado Aparicio, Daniel Rodriquez, Roger Loayza, Magaly Medina

Episode 3
First aired: September 21, 2013

Disqualified: Lorena Dávila	
Best photo: Sami Hauge	
Bottom two: Claudia Narváez & Johana Saavedra	  
Eliminated: Claudia Narváez
Featured photographer: César Guerrero
Special guests: Vero Momenti, Marco Apolaya, Rafael Delgado Aparicio

Episode 4
First aired: September 28, 2013

Best photo: Laura Cuadros	 
Bottom two: Danea Panta & Tatiana Calmell del Solar
Saved from elimination: Danea Panta
Featured photographer: Yayo López
Special guests: Ana María Giulfo, Sitka Semsch

Episode 5
First aired: October 5, 2013

Immune: Sharinna Vargas	
Bottom two: Gianna Natal & Johana Saavedra
Eliminated: Gianna Natal
Special guests: Roberto Otoya, Patricia Uehara

Episode 6
First aired: October 12, 2013

Best photo: Giordana Carrillo
Bottom two: Laura Cuadros & Tatiana Calmell del Solar
Eliminated: Tatiana Calmell del Solar
Featured photographer: Lucia Arana
Special guests: Gerardo Privat, Jimena Mujica

Episode 7
First aired: October 19, 2013

Best photo: Danea Panta
Bottom two: Molly Tuesta & Sami Hauge
Eliminated: Molly Tuesta
Featured photographers: Carlos Rojas, Edward Alba
Special guests: Gian Piero Díaz, Andrea Llosa

Episode 8
First aired: October 26, 2013

Best photo: Danea Panta
Bottom two: Laura Cuadros & Sharinna Vargas	
Eliminated: Sharinna Vargas
Featured photographer: Rafo Iparraguirre
Special guests: Gerardo Larrea, Antonio Choy-Kay

Episode 9
First aired: November 2, 2013

Best photo: Giordana Carrillo	
Bottom two: Danea Panta & Johana Saavedra
Eliminated: Johana Saavedra
Featured photographer: Jacques Ferrand
Special guests: Andrea Llosa, Sumy Kujon, Ana Maria Guiulfo, Adriana Miro Quesada, Javier Rivero, Noe Bernacelli

Episode 10
First aired: November 9, 2013

Best photo: Giordana Carrillo
Bottom two: Giordana Carrillo & Sami Hauge
Eliminated: Sami Hauge
Special guests: Fiorella Espejo, Percy Céspedez

Episode 11
First aired: November 16, 2013

 Best photo: Danea Panta	
 Bottom two: Giordana Carrillo & Laura Cuadros	  
 Eliminated: Laura Cuadros
 Featured photographers: Edward Alva, Jacques Ferrand
 Special guests: Adriana Miro Quesada, Veronica Momenti

Episode 12
First aired: November 23, 2013

 Final two: Danea Panta	& Giordana Carrillo
 Peru's Next Top Model: Danea Panta
 Featured photographer: Jacques Ferrand
 Special guests: Pepe Corzo

Contestants
Semi-finalists

Finalists

 Molly, Samantha, Sami, Sharinna, and Tatiana all previously participated in Elite Model Look Peru 2011.

Summaries

 The contestant that was eliminated from the competition
 The contestant that was disqualified from the competition
 The contestant that was originally eliminated but was saved
 The contestant that was immune from elimination
 The contestant won the competition

Notes

Photo shoot guide
 Episode 1 photo shoot: Simplistic full body shots; nude group shot with fabric (casting)
 Episode 2 photo shoot: Goth women channeling high fashion in Gamarra
 Episode 3 photo shoot: Showcasing new looks in 90's clothing
 Episode 4 photo shoot: Gladiator women in La Herradura beach
 Episode 5 video shoot: Runway show in a hangar
 Episode 6 photo shoot: Chandon champagne on a yacht with Antonio Borges in B&W
 Episode 7 photo shoots: Agua Cielo advertisements; topless FinArt jewelry beauty shots covered in paint
 Episode 8 photo shoot: Glamazons in the jungle
 Episode 9 photo shoot: Elongating body in 40's couture
 Episode 10 commercial & photo shoot: Movistar adverts; posing with a boa constrictor
 Episode 11 photo shoots: Horseback riding for Cosas; natural, skincare, and nighttime L'Bel beauty shots
 Episode 12 photo shoots: Futuristic Inca princesses in Machu Picchu; embodying the Holy Virgin

Makeovers
 Claudia: Shaved in the back, kept long in the front
 Danea: Bob Cut
 Gianna: Dyed Beach Blonde
 Giordana: Treated for damage with extra shine
 Johana: Trimmed 
 Laura: Fringes added
 Molly: Trimmed, curled, brown highlights added
 Sami: Bleached Bob
 Sharinna: Straightened 
 Tatiana: Beatles inspired cut, dyed jet-black

Judges
 Valeria De Santis (Host) 
 Antonio Borges
 Kitty Garces

Other cast members
 Sergio Corvacho

References

External links
 Peru'sNTM Website (was http://www.perusnexttopmodel.com/) 
 Official YouTube channel
 Official Facebook page

2013 Peruvian television series debuts
Top Model
2010s Peruvian television series
ATV (Peruvian TV channel) original programming
Non-American television series based on American television series